Luolajan-Mikkola is a compound surname of Finnish origin. Notable people with the name include:
Vilho Luolajan-Mikkola (1911–2005), Finnish composer of contemporary classical music
Markku Luolajan-Mikkola, Finnish baroque cellist and viol player

See also
Mikkola (surname)

Compound surnames
Finnish-language surnames
Surnames of Finnish origin